Jorgen Nielsen is a Danish former footballer and coach.

Gombak United

A handball player in Denmark, Nielsen went to Singapore to work in the shipping trade. When Gombak United went from amateur to professional status, they immediately offered Nielsen a contract but he was uncertain and was not able to envisage success as a footballer. In the end, the Dane decided to join the club and after two years there, was offered the Gombak United manager job. The former striker accepted the contract, overseeing the Singaporean outfit's sales, salaries, sponsorship, merchandise, expenditures, and development of a fan club- quitting the position in April 2001.

While playing for Gombak, Nielsen got permanent residency in Singapore, allowing them to register him as a local rather than foreign footballer and recording four goals in his last season there.

References

Year of birth missing (living people)
Living people
Danish men's footballers
Expatriate footballers in Singapore
Gombak United FC players
Danish expatriate men's footballers
Singapore Premier League players
Association football forwards
Association football wingers
Expatriate football managers in Singapore
Danish football managers
Danish expatriate football managers
Gombak United FC head coaches